Miss Madame may refer to:
 Miss Madame (1934 film), a German comedy film
 Miss Madame (1923 film), an Austrian silent film